Grimaud is a village and commune in the Var department in the Provence-Alpes-Côte d'Azur region in southeastern France.

It is located on the French Riviera. The village of Grimaud is a perched village, with historical links to the Grimaldi family. Gibelin de Grimaldi aided William the Good in driving the Saracens of Fraxinet out of the area in AD 973 and was rewarded with the land. The village is dominated by its 11th-century castle (partially restored).

The Gulf of Saint Tropez was known as the Gulf of Grimaud until the end of the 19th century. The seaside town of Port Grimaud lies within the commune, at the head of the gulf.

See also
Communes of the Var department

References

External links
More information about Grimaud and its surroundings
More photos of Grimaud and its surroundings
Grimaud Tourist Information

Communes of Var (department)